The following is the order of battle for the Battle of Red Cliffs (208–209 AD).

Cao Cao forces 
 Imperial Chancellor (丞相) Cao Cao
 (Acting) General Who Attacks the South (征南將軍) Cao Ren
 Army Protector and Commandant (都督護軍) Zhao Yan, coordinated the units commanded by the following seven officers:
 General of Tiger's Might (虎威將軍) Yu Jin
 General Who Defeats Bandits (盪寇將軍) Zhang Liao
 General Who Pacifies the Di (平狄將軍) Zhang He
 General Who Defeats Barbarians (破虜將軍) Li Dian
 Zhu Ling
 Lu Zhao (路招)
 Feng Kai (馮楷)
 General Who Sweeps Across the Wilderness (橫野將軍) Xu Huang
 General of Uplifting Martial Might (奮武將軍) Cheng Yu
 Palace Counsellor (太中大夫) Jia Xu
 Administrator of Runan (汝南太守) Man Chong

Total strength of combined land and naval forces: ≈800,000 (according to Cao Cao's claim); ≈220,000–240,000 (according to Zhou Yu's estimations)

Sun Quan forces 
 General Who Attacks Barbarians (討虜將軍) Sun Quan
 Central Army Protector (中護軍) Zhou Yu, served as the Left Chief Controller (左都督).
 General of the Household Who Defeats Bandits (盪寇中郎將) Cheng Pu, served as the Right Chief Controller (右都督).
 Colonel Who Praises the Army (贊軍校尉) Lu Su
 General of the Household Who Attacks Barbarians (征虜中郎將) Lü Fan
 General of the Household Who Sweeps Across the Wilderness (橫野中郎將) Lü Meng
 General of the Household (中郎將) Han Dang
 Commandant of Danyang (丹陽都尉) Huang Gai
 Commandant of Vehemence (承烈都尉) Ling Tong
 Chief of Yichun (宜春長) Zhou Tai
 Gan Ning

Total strength of combined land and naval forces: ≈30,000

Liu Bei and Liu Qi forces 
 General of the Left (左將軍) Liu Bei
 Lieutenant-General (偏將軍) Guan Yu
 General of the Household (中郎將) Zhang Fei
 Zhuge Liang
 Administrator of Jiangxia (江夏太守) Liu Qi

Total strength of combined land and naval forces: ≈20,000

References 

 Chen, Shou (3rd century). Records of the Three Kingdoms (Sanguozhi).
 Pei, Songzhi (5th century). Annotations to Records of the Three Kingdoms (Sanguozhi zhu).
 Sima, Guang (1084). Zizhi Tongjian.
 

208
Red Cliffs 208
Red Cliffs 208
Orders of battle
200s conflicts